Flavored fortified wines or tonic wines (known informally as bum wines or bum vino) are inexpensive fortified wines that typically have an alcohol content between 13% and 20% alcohol by volume (ABV). They are made from various fruits (including grapes and citrus fruits) with added sugar, artificial flavor, and artificial color.

Brands
 Buckfast Tonic Wine is a tonic wine with added alcohol, caffeine, and sugar, produced under license from Buckfast Abbey, a Roman Catholic monastery located in Devon, England. It is particularly popular along the central belt of Scotland, especially Glasgow, Faifley, East Kilbride, Hamilton, Coatbridge and other Strathclyde areas, as well as Falkirk, Fife, Edinburgh and the Lothians, but critics have blamed it for being a cause of social problems in Scotland. Some have nicknamed it "Wreck the Hoose Juice". It also enjoys strong popularity and near cult-following in Northern Ireland, often referred to simply as "Bucky" and in some cases "Lurgan Champagne".
 Divas Vkat (originally Vodkat).  Made in the Riverina region of New South Wales, Australia, Divas produce a range of flavoured and unflavoured fortified wines used as a substitute to traditional mixers such as vodka, triple sec and coconut rum.  Alcohol levels vary by flavour, but tend to be between 20% and 22% alcohol by volume (40 to 44 proof).  There is also a range of "Ready to Drink" (RTD) 330 mL pre-mixed cocktails in a four-pack, with a strength of 8% alcohol by volume.
 MD 20/20 (often called by its nickname Mad Dog) is an American fortified wine. The MD  stands for its producer, Mogen David. MD 20/20 has an alcohol content that varies by flavor from 13% to 18%. Initially, 20/20 stood for 20 oz at 20% alcohol. Currently, MD 20/20 is sold neither in 20 oz bottles nor at 20% alcohol by volume.
 Solntsedar (named after a town on the Black Sea where it was produced) was a Soviet brand of low-end fortified wine produced using ingredients sourced from Algeria. It was marketed as "port wine" and infamous for many severe cases of alcohol poisoning and for inducing vomiting. Its production was canceled after Mikhail Gorbachev's anti-alcohol laws came into effect.
 Wild Russian Vanya was a fortified fruit wine vinted and bottled by the Seabord Beverage Co and sold in the southeastern American states (such as Georgia and Florida) during the late 1960s and early 1970s. It was referred to in commercials as WILD RUSSIAN VANYA, WHAT A WINE, and featured various flavors similar to competitor MD 20/20. It had 20% alcohol by volume. Advertising implied the wine was a Russian import, but it was produced in the US. It went out of production in the late 1970s.
 Two notable brands are produced by the Centerra Wine Company (a division of Constellation Brands).
 Cisco is a fortified wine  with varieties selling at 13.9%, 17.5%, and 19.5% alcohol by volume (ABV). It has a syrupy consistency and a sweet taste. Because of its original color and bottle shape, it was frequently mistaken for a wine cooler. The Federal Trade Commission eventually required the company to put labels on their bottles stating that Cisco is not a wine cooler, to change the shape and color of their containers, and to recall their advertising slogan "Takes you by surprise".
 Richards Wild Irish Rose was introduced in 1954 and, at its height, sold about two million cases annually. The brand is available in 13.9% and 18% alcohol by volume and comes in both "red" and "white" varieties. The red is described as tasting like "cheap cherry hard candy" and the white like "crunchy milk and fake vanilla".

 Three popular brands in this category have been produced by the E & J Gallo Winery and were a large part of that company's early success.
 Ripple was a fortified and carbonated wine that was popular in the United States, particularly in the 1970s (and made famous by Fred G. Sanford of Sanford and Son). Possessing a low 11% ABV (lower than modern table wines), it was originally marketed to "casual" drinkers. Due to its low price, it gained a negative reputation as a drink for destitute alcoholics. Due to its low price, it was popular among young drinkers, both underage and college students. It was later replaced with Boone's Farm.
 Night Train Express, usually abbreviated to Night Train, typically contains 17.5% ABV. Night Train Express has been condemned by some civic leaders who think inexpensive high-alcohol content drinks contribute to vagrancy and public drunkenness. A full bottle was consumed by Joliet Jake in The Blues Brothers, after which he holds his head and refers to it as a "mean wine". The song "Nightrain" by rock band Guns N' Roses also pays tribute to this spirit.
 Thunderbird (The American Classic), a flavored, fortified wine of 13–18% ABV. Ernest Gallo ordered the development of the wine upon discovering that inexpensive white port wine was popular in the inner city and skid row neighborhoods, where shopkeepers would display lemon juice bottles and Kool-Aid packets next to the wine, which patrons would purchase to mix with the port and produce their desired flavor. A 1957 radio jingle proclaimed: "What's the word? Thunderbird / How's it sold? Good and cold / What's the jive? 'Bird's alive / What's the price? Thirty twice." (i.e. 60 cents, at a time when the federal minimum wage was $1 per hour.) Gallo salesmen supposedly dropped empty Thunderbird bottles in the streets of skid-row neighborhoods to build brand awareness among city "wino" populations. The wine became so popular among the indigent that Gallo recounted a story in which he encountered a wino drinking on a sidewalk in Atlanta, and upon asking him, "What's the word?", the man shouted "Thunderbird!" after which both laughed. Another salesman told of giving free samples to alcoholics and newly released prisoners.

History
An early reference to the problem of cheap and poorly made wines is in the "Report on Cheap Wines" in the 5 November 1864 issue of The Medical Times and Gazette. The author, in prescribing inexpensive wines for several ills, cautions against the "fortified" wines of the day, describing one sample that he had tried:

It is reported, however, that the popularity of cheap, fortified wines in the United States arose in the 1930s as a product of Prohibition and the Great Depression:

Concerns and media attention
While overtaken somewhat in the low-end alcoholic drink market by sweetened malt beverages by the 1990s, the appeal of cheap fortified wines to the poor and homeless has often raised concerns:

In 2005, the Seattle City Council asked the Washington State Liquor Control Board to prohibit the sale of certain alcohol products in an impoverished "Alcohol Impact Area". Among the products sought to be banned were over two dozen beers and six wines: Cisco, Gino's Premium Blend, MD 20/20, Night Train, Thunderbird, and Wild Irish Rose. The Liquor Control Board approved these restrictions on 30 August 2006. The cities of Tacoma, Washington and Spokane, Washington also followed suit in instituting "Alcohol Impact Areas" of their own following Seattle's example.

See also

 Aromatized wine
 Buckfast Tonic Wine
 Ginger wine
 Ice beer
 Jabol
 Jug wine
 Malt liquor
 Muscatel
 Rotgut
 Scotsmac

References

Fortified wine
Premixed alcoholic drinks
Wine terminology